The 1980 Idaho Vandals football team represented the University of Idaho in the 1980 NCAA Division I-AA football season. The Vandals were led by third-year head coach Jerry Davitch and were members of the Big Sky Conference. They played their home games at the Kibbie Dome, an indoor facility on campus in Moscow, Idaho.

Idaho lost to rival Boise State for the fourth straight year. BSU won the Big Sky title in 1980 and competed in the four-team Division I-AA playoffs; the Broncos won the finals over defending champion 

It was the first winning season for the Vandals since 1976 and only the fourth winning record for the football program in over

Notable players
Transfer quarterback Ken Hobart from Kamiah was a four-year starter. He quickly adjusted from an option quarterback in the veer under Davitch to a prolific passer under new head coach Dennis Erickson in 1982. He led the Vandals to a 9–4 record in 1982 and an 8–3 record in 1983 as a fifth-year senior, when he was a Division I-AA All-American. Hobart played a season in the USFL with Jacksonville in 1984 and several in the CFL.

Sophomore linebacker Sam Merriman from Tucson, Arizona, was selected in the seventh round (177th overall) of the 1983 NFL Draft by the Seattle Seahawks. A four-year starter for the Vandals, he played five seasons with Seattle, primarily on special teams. He was a probable starter in 1988, but a serious knee injury in a preseason game (on a punt return in overtime) ended his

Fallen teammate
Glen White was the Vandals' leading rusher during his junior season in 1979, the best season by a UI running back in the 1970s.  the  but gained 889 yards and averaged 5.0 yards per carry in the final ten games as the team finished at 4–7.

While in off-season training in February, White felt weakness and was sent to Seattle for further testing. Diagnosed with aplastic anemia, he battled it for several months until his death from complications on August 9 at an Oklahoma City hospital, near his parents' home  White, age 22, was posthumously designated an honorary team captain for all eleven  games, and the Vandals wore his number 32 on the left side of their helmets during the

Schedule

Roster

All-conference
Tackle Bruce Fery was the only Vandal on the first team; second team selections were running back Russell Davis, defensive end Larry Barker, linebacker Sam Merriman, cornerback Carlton McBride, and placekicker Pete O'Brien. Honorable mention picks included quarterback Ken Hobart, tight end Tom Coombs, defensive end Jay Hayes, safety Kelly Miller, and punter Chris Brockman.

NFL Draft
No Vandals were selected in the 1981 NFL Draft, which lasted twelve rounds (332 selections).

Two Vandal juniors were later selected in the 1982 NFL Draft, also twelve rounds (334 selections).

List of Idaho Vandals in the NFL Draft

References

External links
Gem of the Mountains: 1981 University of Idaho yearbook – 1980 football season
Idaho Argonaut – student newspaper – 1980  editions

Idaho
Idaho Vandals football seasons
Idaho Vandals football